Roy Alexander Smith Lewis (born 19 April 1990) is a Costa Rican professional footballer who plays as a centre-back.

Club career
Smith started his career at Brujas and had a spell at Orión. He then moved abroad to play for Japanese second division side Gainare Tottori in 2012, where he was joined by compatriot Kenny Cunningham and in January 2013 Bolivian champions The Strongest announced Smith's arrival at the club, with Cunningham again joining him. He scored his first goal for The Strongest in March 2013 against Oriente Petrolero.

He returned to Costa Rica and made his debut for Uruguay in August 2013 against Cartaginés He moved to Santos de Guápiles in summer 2014.

International career
Smith played at the 2007 FIFA U-17 World Cup and in the 2009 FIFA U-20 World Cup, where the Costa Rica national under-20 football team, came 4th after losing to Hungary in the match for the 3rd place.

He made his senior debut for Costa Rica in an October 2010 friendly match against Peru and won his second cap, as of November 2014, a few days later against El Salvador.

References

External links
 
 
 

1990 births
Living people
People from Limón Province
Association football defenders
Costa Rican footballers
Costa Rican expatriate footballers
Costa Rica international footballers
Brujas FC players
Gainare Tottori players
The Strongest players
Santos de Guápiles footballers
C.D. Honduras Progreso players
C.S. Cartaginés players
C.D. Marathón players
Limón F.C. players
Liga FPD players
Liga Nacional de Fútbol Profesional de Honduras players
J2 League players
Bolivian Primera División players
Costa Rican expatriate sportspeople in Japan
Costa Rican expatriate sportspeople in Bolivia
Costa Rican expatriate sportspeople in Honduras
Expatriate footballers in Japan
Expatriate footballers in Bolivia
Expatriate footballers in Honduras